is a Japanese cinematographer based in France. He was the Director of Photography for numerous films, including Narco, Paris, je t'aime and La Vie En Rose 
. He won the César Award for Best Cinematography twice, in 2001 for The Officers' Ward and in 2007 for La Vie en rose. Nagata was also Director of Photography for commercials such companies as Rolex, Clinique and Honda. He received the 39th Japan Academy Film Prize for Excellent Cinematography for 125 Years Memory (2015).

Filmography
 Emergency (2023)
 Dhaakad (2022)
 125 Years Memory (2015)
 Leonie (2010)
 Micmacs (2009)
 Splice (2009)
 La Vie en rose (2007)
 Paris, je t'aime (2006)  segment "Quartier de la Madeleine"
 Animal (2005)
 Daiteiden no yoru ni (2005)
 Blueberry (2004)
 Narco (2004)
 Laisse tes mains sur mes hanches (2003)
 Steal (2002)
 The Officers' Ward (2001)
 Stand-by (2000)
 C'est quoi la vie ? (1999)
 Le Dernier chaperon rouge (1996)
 Faut pas rêver (1992)

References

External links
 Nagata's Official Website
 

Japanese cinematographers
Living people
1952 births
César Award winners